The St Kilda Football Club, nicknamed the Saints, is an Australian rules football club based in Melbourne, Victoria. The club plays in the AFL Women's (AFLW) and VFL Women's (VFLW) competitions. The team is associated with the St Kilda  men's team.

In September 2017, the club was granted a license by the AFL to compete in the league from the start of the 2020 season. The team plays its home games out of Moorabbin Oval, in Moorabbin, Victoria

History

2020–present: Foundation 
On 18 February 2017, the Australian Football League (AFL) announced the creation of a women's competition the following year. St Kilda was one the first 13 clubs to apply for an inaugural license to join the competition. Despite being unsuccessful in its bid, it was granted a provisional license, meaning it would take preference over other bidders in subsequent bids. Following the successful completion of the inaugural AFLW season in 2017, the AFL launched a second round of bidding for licenses to enter the competition from 2019 onwards. St Kilda was again among eight clubs that applied. In September 2017, the club was announced as one of six clubs to receive a licence to join the competition, and as one of four to join in 2020.

Players

Current AFLW squad

Reserves teams

Since 2018, St Kilda has fielded a team in the second-tier VFL Women's league, in partnership with VFL men's club Sandringham. The team is referred to as the Southern Saints.

Corporate

Administrative Board
 President: Andrew Bassat
 Vice-president: Russell Caplan
 Chief Executive Officer: Matt Finnis
 Director: Dean Anderson
 Director: Jennifer Douglas
 Director: Paul Kirk
 Director: Jack Rush
 Director: Danni Roche
 Director: Adam Hilton

Club Honour Boards

Honour Boards

AFLW

VFLW (Southern Saints)

Records and statistics

 Biggest winning margin: 56 points (2021, Round 9, v West Coast)
 Biggest score: 11.10 [76] (2021, Round 9, v West Coast) 
 Most premiership points in a season: 12 (2021)
 Most consecutive wins: 1 (2020, 2021)

Achievements
Club Best and Fairest

Notes

References

External links

St Kilda Football Club
AFL Women's clubs
Australian rules football clubs in Melbourne
Sport in the City of Kingston (Victoria)